Unclogged is a live album by the American rock band X, released in 1995 by Infidelity Records. Recorded in 1994 at the Noe Valley Ministries Presbyterian Church in San Francisco, California over two nights of performances, it presented acoustic arrangements of past X material, along with two new songs: "Lying in the Road" and "The Stage." The album's title was a play on the title of the MTV Unplugged television show and album series, which featured bands playing acoustic arrangements of their most popular songs.

Track listing
"White Girl" – 4:02
"Because I Do" – 3:05
"Lying in the Road" – 3:34
"Unheard Music" – 3:39
"I Must Not Think Bad Thoughts" – 4:50
"Burning House of Love" – 3:51
"The Stage" – 4:17
"See How We Are" – 4:49
"True Love" – 2:23
"The Have Nots" – 4:21
"The World's a Mess, It's in My Kiss" – 4:43
"I See Red" – 3:31
"What's Wrong w/ Me" – 4:11

Personnel
X
D. J. Bonebrake – percussion, drums, vibraphone
Exene Cervenka – vocals, acoustic guitar
John Doe – vocals, bass, acoustic guitar
Tony Gilkyson – acoustic and electric guitar, vocals
Technical
Mark Shoffner - recording
Kristian Hoffman - cover painting

References

External links
Album Review at Sputnik Music

X (American band) live albums
1993 live albums